Rhinella abei is a species of toads in the family Bufonidae. It is endemic to southeastern Brazil where it occurs in eastern Paraná, eastern Santa Catarina, and northern Rio Grande do Sul. Its natural habitats are lowland Atlantic Forest below  asl. Its habitat is suffering from degradation and fragmentation caused by logging (in the past) and clearance for agriculture and coastal development, posing threats to this species.

References

abei
Endemic fauna of Brazil
Amphibians of Brazil
Amphibians described in 2004
Taxonomy articles created by Polbot